Chichester station was the Ulster and Delaware Railroad's small station that served the village of Chichester, New York, branch MP 1.6. The old Chichester station was a lot like a small shack with a platform on it that was two miles away from the Phoenicia station, and 29.5 miles from Kingston Point. It had a nearby lumber shoot where wood would be delivered to the furniture factory across the creek. The old station burnt down in 1902, and was replaced with a shelter. It didn't generate much business, and was abandoned after the New York Central bought the U&D in 1932, and it was later scrapped.

Bibliography

References

External links
Ulster and Delaware Railroad Historical Society map

Railway stations in the Catskill Mountains
Railway stations closed in 1940
Former Ulster and Delaware Railroad stations
Railway stations in Ulster County, New York
Former railway stations in New York (state)
1881 establishments in New York (state)
Railway stations in the United States opened in 1881